Robert Raikes later known as Robert Raikes Fulthorpe (1683–1753), of Northallerton, Yorkshire, was an English lawyer and Member of Parliament.

He was a Member (MP) of the Parliament of England for Northallerton 1710 to 1713.

References

1683 births
1753 deaths
18th-century English people
People from Northallerton
British MPs 1710–1713

18th-century English lawyers